The 2011 U.S. Figure Skating Championships was held in Greensboro, North Carolina on January 22–30, 2011. Skaters competed in the men's singles, ladies' singles, pair skating, and ice dancing on the senior, junior, and novice levels. The event was part of the selection process for several international events, including the 2011 World Championships.

The event resulted in direct economic impacts of $27.4 million and an additional $24 million in media impacts, with tax revenues of over $2.2 million.

Schedule

Senior results

Men

Ladies

Pairs

Ice dancing

Junior results

Men

Ladies

Pairs

Ice dancing

Novice results

Men

Ladies

Pairs

Ice dancing

International team selections

World Championships

Four Continents Championships

World Junior Championships

References

External links 

 2011 United States Figure Skating Championships results
 
 Official site
 international teams

2011
Sports competitions in Greensboro, North Carolina
2011 in American sports
2011 in figure skating
January 2011 sports events in the United States